Nawaf Al-Rashoudi (born 18 August 2000) is a Saudi Arabian professional footballer who plays as an attacking midfielder for Pro League side Al-Taawoun.

Club career
Al-Rashoudi started his career at Al-Taawoun and is a product of the Al-Taawoun's youth system. He was first called up to the first team after the 2019–20 season resumed following the COVID-19 pandemic. On 24 October 2020, Al-Rashoudi signed his first professional contract with the club. On 5 November 2020, Al-Rashoudi joined Al-Arabi on loan. On 2 October 2021, Al-Rashoudi made his professional debut for Al-Taawoun against Al-Tai in the Pro League, replacing Kaku.

References

External links
 

2000 births
Living people
Saudi Arabian footballers
Association football midfielders
Al-Taawoun FC players
Al-Arabi SC (Saudi Arabia) players
Saudi Professional League players
Saudi Second Division players